Vinogradovo or Vynohradove is the name of several settlements in Eastern Europe:

Russia 

 Vinogradovo, a village in Sheksninsky District, Vologda Oblast.

Ukraine 

 Vynohradove, a village in Kherson Raion, Kherson Oblast.
 Vynohradiv, a city in Zakarpattia Oblast formerly known as Vinogradovo in Russian.

See also 

 Vinogradov